René Beuchel (born 7 July 1973, in Dresden) is a German former professional footballer. He is best known for two spells with Dynamo Dresden, the first beginning in 1992. He moved to Eintracht Frankfurt in 1995, and later played for FSV Zwickau and Dresdner SC before returning to Dynamo in 2002, where he remained for five years, before injury forced him to retire in December 2007. He played as a midfielder or defender.

After retiring
Beuchel worked as general manager at Dynamo Dresden from 2009 until 2012.

References

External links
 

1973 births
Living people
Footballers from Dresden
German footballers
Association football defenders
Association football midfielders
Bundesliga players
2. Bundesliga players
Dynamo Dresden players
Dynamo Dresden II players
Eintracht Frankfurt players
FSV Zwickau players
Dresdner SC players
Germany under-21 international footballers
Dynamo Dresden non-playing staff